Rannerdale Knotts is a fell in the Lake District of Cumbria, England. Rising from the Buttermere valley, it is one of the smaller Cumbrian hills and is overlooked by a number of surrounding fells, such as Grasmoor, Whiteless Pike and, across Crummock Water, Mellbreak and the High Stile ridge. Rannerdale Knotts is said to be the site of a battle between the native Cumbrians and Norsemen and the invading Normans in the late 11th or early 12th century.

Topography
The North Western Fells occupy the area between the rivers Derwent and Cocker, a broadly oval swathe of hilly country, elongated on a north-south axis. Two roads cross from east to west, dividing the fells into three convenient groups. The central sector, rising between Whinlatter Pass and Newlands Pass, includes Whiteless Pike.

The highest ground in the North Western Fells is an east-west ridge in this central sector, beginning with Grasmoor above Crummock Water and then gradually descending eastwards over Crag Hill, Sail, Scar Crags and Causey Pike. Grasmoor has the greatest elevation, but Crag Hill stands at the hub of the range. It sends out a subsidiary ridge to the south west, stepping down over Wandope and Whiteless Pike toward Buttermere village. Just above the village this ridge then turns sharply north west and rises to the summit of Rannerdale Knotts.

This section of the fell is named Low Bank on Ordnance Survey maps and is clad primarily in bracken. The final section bears a series of rocky knolls, still rising slowly north westward. A tumbling descent of crag and scree then follows as the end of the ridge drops steeply to the valley floor, halfway along the shore of Crummock Water. Rannerdale farm lies below this terminal face.

The south western side of Rannerdale Knotts is bounded first by Mill Beck, running through Buttermere village, and then by Crummock Water. The north eastern flank falls to Squat Beck, a feeder of Rannerdale Beck. High Rannerdale lies within the angle of the ridge between Whiteless Pike and Rannerdale Knotts, Rannerdale proper being a triangular patch of pasture constrained by Rannerdale Knotts, Grasmoor and Crummock Water.

Geology

The summit area shows outcropping of the Kirkstile Formation. These Ordovician rocks, typical of the Skiddaw massif, are composed of laminated mudstone and siltstone. Low Bank lies across the Causey Pike Fault and is part of the Buttermere Formation, an olistostrome of disrupted sheared and folded mudstone, siltstone and sandstone. There are also two minor intrusions of basalt running across the ridgeline.

There is a trial level in the northern crags, above Hause Point on the Crummock Water road. The opening is about  square but the level extends only a little way into the fell-side. The object appears to have been lead-bearing galena of which some traces remain.

Summit
The small tidy summit on the highest rock knoll bears a cairn. The view is limited by the circle of higher fells, but the vista of Buttermere backed by Great Gable is excellent. Crummock Water can also be brought into view by taking a few paces westward.

Ascents
There is a more direct ascent  up the west face of the fell from Hause Point at Rannerdale, accessed from the B5289 road on the eastern shore of Crummock Water. A larger circuit of Rannerdale can also be made, taking in Grasmoor, Crag Hill, Wandope, Whiteless Pike and Rannerdale Knotts.

The Battle of Rannerdale and The Secret Valley
Local historian and publican Nicholas Size published a historical novel in 1930 called The Secret Valley, which tells the story of how this area resisted the Norman invaders in the 50 years after the 1066 Norman invasion. According to Size, the Norman army was ambushed and defeated by the native Britons and Norsemen at the Battle of Rannerdale.

The battle is thought to have taken place in the side valley of Rannerdale, which runs east of the summit of the fell, west of Whiteless Pike and south of Grasmoor. Bluebells grow in profusion in this valley in April and May. According to local folklore, the bluebells are said to have sprung from the spilt blood of the slain Norman warriors.

A Norman army under the command of Ranulf Meschin, Earl of Carlisle, advanced south from Cockermouth. (Ranulf Meschin is Size's anglicised version of Norman nobleman Ranulph les Meschines.) The local warriors were commanded by the Earl Boethar, who succeeded in drawing the Normans into the side valley of Rannerdale, then routed them with a surprise attack from above and behind.

In Size's version, Ranulf Meschin escaped and lived in disgrace until he succeeded a relative as Earl of Chester in 1120.

Little historical evidence is available to support Size's version of the story, which is a romanticised tale of the last stand of the native Britons against the invading force.

The Buttermere area does not appear in the Domesday Book, which indicates that this part of Cumbria was not under Norman control in 1086. The central area of the Lake District is known to have been populated by the earlier Norse invaders in the early 10th century, and dale is etymologically Norse. Cumbria was ostensibly part of Scotland, until seized by the forces of William Rufus in 1092, following a dispute with Scottish king Malcolm III, himself killed a year later at the Battle of Alnwick. William Rufus gave Norman nobleman Ranulph les Meschines lands in Cumbria following this conquest of the area. When Ranulph les Meschines became Earl of Chester, his estates were returned to the Crown. Around 1120, Henry I of England gave the Barony of Copeland to Ranulph's brother William les Meschines, who settled at then initiated the construction of the castle at Egremont on Cumbria's western coast.

Size himself died aged 86, having negotiated fiercely with the local district council to be buried on the fells. His grave overlooks Rannerdale. His epitaph reads:

No tombstone virtues will ornament my grave
No over-confidence about salvation,
Write me down one that loved his fellow men
And was a credit to his generation.

See also

 History of Cumbria
 Etymology of Cumbrian Place Names

References

External links
  The Secret Valley by Nicholas Size
  Views of Rannerdale side valley and bluebells

Fells of the Lake District
Buttermere, Cumbria (village)